In Greek mythology, Erigone was the daughter of Aegisthus and Clytemnestra, rulers of Mycenae. Some accounts said that by her half-brother, Orestes, Erigone was the mother of Penthilus and Tisamenus.

Mythology 
Erigone would have been slain by Orestes along with her brother Aletes if not for the intervention of Artemis, who rescued her and made her a priestess in Attica. In some stories, she hangs herself after the child is born, though this may be a confusion with Erigone, daughter of Icarius. Also, after Hermione died, she is said to have married Orestes and gave birth to Penthilus. Or it is said she sued Orestes for the murder of her parents.

Notes

References 

 Gaius Julius Hyginus, Fabulae from The Myths of Hyginus translated and edited by Mary Grant. University of Kansas Publications in Humanistic Studies. Online version at the Topos Text Project.
 Pausanias, Description of Greece with an English Translation by W.H.S. Jones, Litt.D., and H.A. Ormerod, M.A., in 4 Volumes. Cambridge, MA, Harvard University Press; London, William Heinemann Ltd. 1918. Online version at the Perseus Digital Library
 Pausanias, Graeciae Descriptio. 3 vols. Leipzig, Teubner. 1903.  Greek text available at the Perseus Digital Library.
 Pseudo-Apollodorus, The Library with an English Translation by Sir James George Frazer, F.B.A., F.R.S. in 2 Volumes, Cambridge, MA, Harvard University Press; London, William Heinemann Ltd. 1921. Online version at the Perseus Digital Library. Greek text available from the same website.

Princesses in Greek mythology

Attican characters in Greek mythology
Mythology of Argolis